A directeur sportif (French for sporting director, although the original French term is often used in English-language media; plural directeurs sportifs) is a person directing a cycling team during a road bicycle racing event.  It is seen as the equivalent to a field manager in baseball, or a head coach in football. At professional level, a directeur sportif follows the team in a car and communicates with riders, personnel and race officials by radio.

The directeur sportif warns of obstacles or challenging terrain, updates the team on the situation in the race, and provides mechanical help.  The car carrying the directeur sportif also usually carries a bicycle mechanic with spare bikes, wheels and parts.  It also carries spare water bottles, food and medical equipment.

Since the late 1990s, the role has increased, in keeping with better team cohesion, tactics and communication and telemetry equipment.  The directeur sportif can have split times, find where riders from other teams are in the race, and dictate orders to riders.  This has made teamwork and tactics more important.

A directeur sportif can also be involved in the riders' training and racing programme. Many are former professionals, such as Johan Bruyneel and Sean Yates.

Gord Fraser described his role as directeur sportif as follows:

Several directeurs sportifs are also associated with famous riders whom they have nurtured. Patrick Lefevere with Johan Museeuw and Tom Boonen, Cyrille Guimard's relationship with Lucien Van Impe, Bernard Hinault, and later Laurent Fignon as well as a young Greg LeMond prior to his Tour victories; Jean de Gribaldy with Sean Kelly and Joaquim Agostinho; and Bruyneel with Lance Armstrong are examples. Others include Guillaume “Lomme” Driessens who was a Directeur for Eddy Merckx and Roger Legeay who directed LeMond during his win in the 1990 Tour de France.

References

External links

 Complete French site about Jean de Gribaldy

Road bicycle racing terminology
Management occupations